This is a list of episodes of the 2011-2012 Kamen Rider Series Kamen Rider Fourze. Each episode title consists of four kanji, separated from each other, but which can be read as a full statement together.

Episodes


{| class="wikitable" width="98%"
|-style="border-bottom:8px solid #DCDCDC"
! width="4%" | # !! Title !! Writer !! Original airdate
|-|colspan="5" bgcolor="#e6e9ff"|

Youth-Ful Trans-Formation

|-|colspan="5" bgcolor="#e6e9ff"|

Space Is Amaz-Ing

|-|colspan="5" bgcolor="#e6e9ff"|

Queen E-Lec-Tion

|-|colspan="5" bgcolor="#e6e9ff"|

Trans-Formation Se-Cret

|-|colspan="5" bgcolor="#e6e9ff"|

Friend-Ship Two-Faced

|-|colspan="5" bgcolor="#e6e9ff"|

Blitz-Krieg Only Way

|-|colspan="5" bgcolor="#e6e9ff"|

The King, The Jerk

|-|colspan="5" bgcolor="#e6e9ff"|

Iron Knight's Coop-Eration

|-|colspan="5" bgcolor="#e6e9ff"|

The Witch Awa-Kens

|-|colspan="5" bgcolor="#e6e9ff"|

Moon-Light Rum-Ble

|-|colspan="5" bgcolor="#e6e9ff"|

Dis-Appearing Moon-Door

|-|colspan="5" bgcolor="#e6e9ff"|

Mis-Sion Ken's Life

|-|colspan="5" bgcolor="#e6e9ff"|

School Re-Jec-Tion

|-|colspan="5" bgcolor="#e6e9ff"|

Sting-Er At-Tack

|-|colspan="5" bgcolor="#e6e9ff"|

Holy Night Cho-Rus

|-|colspan="5" bgcolor="#e6e9ff"|

Right-Wrong Con-Flict

|-|colspan="5" bgcolor="#e6e9ff"|

Me-Teor Ar-Rival

|-|colspan="5" bgcolor="#e6e9ff"|

Gen/Ryu Show-Down

|-|colspan="5" bgcolor="#e6e9ff"|

Steel Dragon, No Equal

|-|colspan="5" bgcolor="#e6e9ff"|

Excel-Lent Magne-Tism

|-|colspan="5" bgcolor="#e6e9ff"|

Gui-Dance Mis-Counseling

|-|colspan="5" bgcolor="#e6e9ff"|

True Self Rejec-Tion

|-|colspan="5" bgcolor="#e6e9ff"|

The Swan Un-Ion

|-|colspan="5" bgcolor="#e6e9ff"|

Hero-Ic De-Sire

|-|colspan="5" bgcolor="#e6e9ff"|

Grad-Uation Trou-Bles

|-|colspan="5" bgcolor="#e6e9ff"|

Per-Fect Round Dance

|-|colspan="5" bgcolor="#e6e9ff"|

Trans-Formation De-Nied

|-|colspan="5" bgcolor="#e6e9ff"|

Star-Storm Come-Back

|-|colspan="5" bgcolor="#e6e9ff"|

Jun-Ior Sil-Ence

|-|colspan="5" bgcolor="#e6e9ff"|

Sen-Ior Futil-Ity

|-|colspan="5" bgcolor="#e6e9ff"|

Plei-Ades King-Dom

|-|colspan="5" bgcolor="#e6e9ff"|

Super Cos-Mic Sword

|-|colspan="5" bgcolor="#e6e9ff"|

Old City May-Hem

|-|colspan="5" bgcolor="#e6e9ff"|

Sky Hole Offense/Defense

|-|colspan="5" bgcolor="#e6e9ff"|

Mon-Ster Broad-Cast

|-|colspan="5" bgcolor="#e6e9ff"|

Seri-Ous Last Song

|-|colspan="5" bgcolor="#e6e9ff"|

Star Group Selec-Tion

|-|colspan="5" bgcolor="#e6e9ff"|

Win-Ner Deci-Sion

|-|colspan="5" bgcolor="#e6e9ff"|

Cam-Pus Ordi-Nance

|-|colspan="5" bgcolor="#e6e9ff"|

I-Dea Pas-Sion

|-|colspan="5" bgcolor="#e6e9ff"|

The Club Col-Lapses

|-|colspan="5" bgcolor="#e6e9ff"|

Sagit-Tarius Con-Trols

|-|colspan="5" bgcolor="#e6e9ff"|

Gem-Ini Light/Shade

|-|colspan="5" bgcolor="#e6e9ff"|

Star Fate Cere-Mony

|-|colspan="5" bgcolor="#e6e9ff"|

Li-Bra De-Fects

|-|colspan="5" bgcolor="#e6e9ff"|

Supe-Rior Sagit-Tarius

|-|colspan="5" bgcolor="#e6e9ff"|

Close Friends Sepa-Rated

|-|colspan="5" bgcolor="#e6e9ff"|

Youth-Ful Gal-Axy

|}

References

See also

Fourze